The Wendell H. Ford Expressway, also known as the Owensboro Bypass, is a major partial beltway that runs around the outer parts of the city of Owensboro, Kentucky.

Road description 
The expressway begins on the west side of Owensboro at a junction with the original alignment of US 60. Immediately after its start, it has a junction with the Audubon Parkway. After the exit for the Audubon, there are interchanges with Kentucky Route 81 (KY 81), US 431, and US 231. US 231 joins the bypass at the exit for New Hartford Road, and it then intersects Interstate 165 (I-165, the former William H. Natcher Parkway) at that freeway's northern terminus. After the interchange with KY 54 (Leitchfield Road), the road then has additional interchanges with KY 603 and KY 144. The expressway ends at an at-grade intersection with KY 2830, which is part of the original US 60 alignment on the east side of town. US 60/US 231 continues after this point as a regular four-lane highway before the two routes split again. US 231 enters Spencer County, Indiana to the north, while US 60 continues east into to Hancock County, Kentucky.

History

Construction and opening (1966–73)
Construction of the Wendell H. Ford Expressway began in the 1967/68 fiscal year. It began as a two-lane road that went from US 60 to KY 54 on the east side of Owensboro. That segment opened in 1967. By the time the 1968 Official Kentucky Highway Map was released, the expressway expanded to four lanes, and went from the US 60 corridor to the US 431 corridor. The remainder of the expressway from US 431 to another junction with US 60 on the west side of Owensboro was opened to traffic by 1969–70. Interchanges for the Audubon Parkway and the then-new Green River Parkway (later William H. Natcher Parkway, now Interstate 165) were opened upon the opening of the two parkways in 1970 and 1972, respectively.

The later years (1974–2012)
The expressway eventually received the designation of U.S. Route 60 Bypass (US 60 Byp.). In 2004, US 231 was rerouted onto the expressway and onto US 60 east of town so that it would be rerouted to the completed William H. Natcher Bridge once it was completed during that year. US 231 was previously carried over the Ohio River on the Owensboro Bridge.

Expressway extension and the future (2013-present)  
In 2013, the Owensboro–Daviess County Government voted to reroute the regular US 60 to the expressway. In the middle of 2014, a new alignment of the expressway was completed and rerouted to bypass the eastern side of town, and KY 603 was routed onto the existing section of the expressway. This was done to connect to the campus of Owensboro Health Regional Hospital (which was completed in 2013). It was also built to prepare for the building of the proposed Interstate 67 (I-67) when and if it is being built. I-67 was planned to go from some point along I-69 in southwest Indiana, and it would follow the eastern part of the expressway and the Natcher Parkway to create a spur from Owensboro to join the I-65 corridor in Bowling Green.

Major intersections
Note: Mileage listings are of US 60 since the Wendell H. Ford Expressway is now classified as US 60 since 2014.

See also 
List of parkways and named highways in Kentucky

References

External links

Kentucky Transportation Cabinet
US 60 at KentuckyRoads.com

Beltways in the United States
Owensboro, Kentucky
Transportation in Daviess County, Kentucky
U.S. Route 60
U.S. Route 231